Julien Benneteau and Nenad Zimonjić were the defending champions, but chose not to participate together. Benneteau played alongside Michaël Llodra, but lost to Jean-Julien Rojer and Horia Tecău in the first round. Zimonjić teamed up with Daniel Nestor, but lost to Juan Sebastián Cabal and David Marrero in the first round.

Rojer and Tecău won the title, defeating Sam Groth and Leander Paes in the final, 7–5, 6–4.

Seeds

Draw

Draw

Qualifying

Seeds

Qualifiers
  Jonathan Erlich /  Rajeev Ram

Qualifying draw

References
General

Specific

Citi Open - Men's Doubles